"I Love College" is a song by American hip hop recording artist Asher Roth, released on January 13, 2009, as his commercial debut single by Schoolboy, SRC and Universal Motown. The song, which was produced by Mike Caren, Apathy, and Ben H. Allen, serves as the lead single from Roth's debut album, Asleep in the Bread Aisle. The song was later serviced for airplay to radio stations in the United Kingdom on April 27, 2009.

The song is related to Roth's time spent at West Chester University. The song originally sampled "Say It Ain't So" by American rock band Weezer, but was reworked by Ben H. Allen, as it is believed that Weezer's lead singer Rivers Cuomo refused to clear the sample. The song also samples "10% Dis", by MC Lyte.

Music video
The music video was directed by Jonathan Lia and Scooter Braun. It was released to online outlets in early February. The video is set at a house party of the fictional Alpha Sigma Eta (ΑΣΗ) fraternity, and features activities such as binge drinking, smoking marijuana, strip poker, beer pong and "pieing".

Remixes and other versions
A remix was produced for the Loud.com Producers Challenge in partnership with SRC, Asher's record label. The remix was produced by J Cardim and features beatboxer Chesney Snow, who beatboxed the entire beat. The track was released via Loud.com and YouTube.

Asher Roth and Jim Jones performed their remix together at mtvU Spring Break 2009.

In 2010, American rapper Sammy Adams released a version of the song titled "I Hate College". The version has over 10 million views on total YouTube publications.

Chart performance
"I Love College" first appeared on the Billboard charts at number 85 on the Pop 100 in late February, then presently at number 55 on the Hot 100. The song eventually peaked at number 19 on the Pop 100 and number 12 on the Hot 100. The song sold over one-million downloads in the United States in the first twelve weeks after release. It peaked at number 26 in the United Kingdom and at number 53 in Canada.

Charts

Weekly charts

Year-end charts

References

External links
 

2009 songs
2009 debut singles
Asher Roth songs
Songs about alcohol
Songs written by Asher Roth
Drinking songs
Songs written by Mike Caren
SRC Records singles
Universal Motown Records singles